The San Juan Raiders are a semi-pro Puerto Rican football team based in San Juan, Puerto Rico, competing in the Puerto Rico American Football League (PRAFL).

Record

Year-by-year

References

Puerto Rico American Football League teams
Sports in San Juan, Puerto Rico